Clube de Albergaria is a Portuguese women's football team from Albergaria-a-Velha (Aveiro District).

Current squad

 Note: Flags indicate national team as defined under FIFA eligibility rules. Players may hold more than one non-FIFA.

References

External links
 Clube de Albergaria's website
 Clube de Albergaria on zeroazero.pt

Women's football clubs in Portugal
Sport in Albergaria-a-Velha
Campeonato Nacional de Futebol Feminino teams